Abdallah Salamé Zureikat (born 1912, date of death unknown) was a Jordanian Ambassador.

Career
From 1934 to 1937 he was Advisor at the Court of Amman.
From 1937 to 1943 he was employed in the Magistracy and Administration.
In 1943 he entered the foreign Service and represented Jordan government in several sessions of the Arab League Cairo.
In 1948 he was Counsellor Jordanian Embassy in Lebanon and Presided an Intellectual Congress.
From 1949 to 1957 he was ambassador in Baghdad  (Iraq)
From 1958 to 1961 he was ambassador in Bonn (Germany)
From 1961 to 1965 he was ambassador in Beirut (Lebanon) with concurrent Diplomatic accreditation in Athens (Greece).
From 1965 to July 1968 he was ambassador in Moscow (Soviet Union).
From July 1968 to 25 April 1970 he was ambassador in Beirut (Lebanon).

References

1912 births
Year of death missing
Ambassadors of Jordan to Iraq
Ambassadors of Jordan to Germany
Ambassadors of Jordan to Lebanon
Ambassadors of Jordan to Russia